Vytautė Genovaitė Žilinskaitė (born December 13 , 1930,  Kaunas ) is a Lithuanian prose writer, humorist, and children's literature writer.

Awards
1965: Vincas Mickevičius-Kapsukas Prize by the Lithuanian Union of Journalists for "Mano neapykanta stipresnė" ["My hatred is stronger: a documentary about the activities of the Raseiniai underground communist youth organization"]
1972: Lithuanian SSR State Prize for the best humorous work 
1979: Lithuanian SSR State Prize for the best children's book  Robotas ir peteliškė [The Robot and the Butterfly]
1996/1997:  Best Children's and Adolescent Book of 1996 and IBBY Lithuania Chapter Award (1997) for Tiputapė
2000/2001:  Best Children's and Adolescent Book of 2001 and IBBY Lithuania Chapter Award (2001) for Nebijokė
2005: Knight's Cross of the Order of the Lithuanian Grand Duke Gediminas
2007: IBBY Lithuania Chapter Award  (for Kintas)
2007: Children's Literature Prize (for Kintas)

References

1930 births
Living people
Lithuanian writers
Lithuanian children's writers